Sofia Hayat is singer, actress and television personality. She participated in Bigg Boss 7 in 2013.

Media career 
In July 2012, Hayat was named the new "Curvy Icon" by Vogue Italia. In September 2013, Hayat named on the FHM sexiest women in the world list in position 81.

She was a contestant on Bigg Boss 7 in 2013. She entered as a wild card entry but got evicted on 12th week on 8 December 2013 (Day 84).

Published her autobiography "Dishonoured : How I Escaped An Arranged Marriage And Survived An Honour Killing To Become A Star" with publishing house John Blake Publishing Ltd.

Released 2 albums, one called Dishonour and the other called Wisdom of The Mother.

Television

Filmography 
 2007 Exitz as Beauty
 2008 Cash and Curry as Dharmi
 2009 The Unforgettable
 2012 Diary of a Butterfly (Hindi) as Carol
 2012 Naachle London as Rani
 2013 Bollywood Carmen  for BBC as Sophia 
 2016 Six X as Ashmit Patel's Girlfriend 
 2017 Aksar 2

Discography
 2015 Mein Ladki Hoon (Music Video)

Spirituality 

In June 2016, Hayat announced that she had embraced spirituality and become a nun. She adopted the name Gaia Sofia Mother.

References

External links
 Official website
 

Living people
Indian film actresses
Bigg Boss (Hindi TV series) contestants
Year of birth missing (living people)